Deportes Valdivia is a Chilean football club in the town of Valdivia, Chile. It currently plays in Segunda División, the third level of Chilean football.

The club was founded on June 5, 1983, and re-founded on December 19, 2003.

Honours
Chilean Segunda División
Winners (1): 2015-16
Apertura Tercera División (Cup)
Winners (1): 2006

Seasons played
2 seasons in Primera División
11 seasons in Primera B
12 seasons in Third Level (Segunda and Tercera División)
2 seasons in Cuarta División

Records
Record Primera División victory — 3–0 v. Cobresal, F. Vial & U. Católica (1988)
Record Copa Chile victory — 5–0 v. Cobreandino (1989)
Record Primera División defeat — 0–6 v. D. La Serena & U. San Felipe (1989)
Most Primera División appearances — 58, Pedro González (1988–89)
Most goals scored (Primera División matches) — 12, Luis Marcoleta (1988)
Highest home attendance  — 7,533 v. Colo-Colo (July 2, 1989)
Primera División Best Position  — 10th (1988)
Copa Chile Best Season  — Semifinals (1989)

Current squad

2021 winter transfers

In

Out

Managers
 Gerardo Reinoso (2014–15)
 Hugo Balladares (2015-2016)
 Ricardo Lunari (2016)

See also
Chilean football league system

References

External links
 Official Club site

 
Valdivia
Valdivia
Sport in Los Ríos Region
1983 establishments in Chile